The 5th Dragoon Regiment (5e Régiment de Dragons or 5e RD) is a cavalry unit of the French Army, created under the Ancien Régime in 1656 and reactivated in 2015. This regiment has a double heritage.

History

1656–59: La Fronde
1667–68: Spanish War of Devolution
Flanders Campaign: Senef 1674, Battle of Cassel (1677)
War of the League of Augsburg: Siege of Namur, Steenkerque 1692, Neerwinden 1693
War of the Spanish Succession: Spire 1703, Ramillies 1706, Lorch 1707, Malplaquet 1709
War of the Austrian Succession: Rocoux 1746, Lauffeld 1747
Seven Years' War: Hastenbeck 1757
French Army of the North: Valmy 1792, Neerwinden 1793 and Wattignies 1793
Ardennes and Sambre-et-Meuse Armies 1794–95
Army of Italy: Mondovì, Castiglione, Bassano 1796, Cremona 1799, Marengo 1800

As part of Napoleon's Grande Armée it fought at Wertingen, Auterlitz in 1805, Nasielsk in 1806, Eylau, and the Battle of Friedland in 1807.

Spain: Almonacid, 1809, Ocana 1809, Battle of Vitoria
War of the Sixth Coalition: Battle of Craonne, Battle of La Fère-Champenoise 1814

In 1815, during the Waterloo campaign of the Hundred Days, the regiment was at the Battle of Ligny and the Battle of Waterloo.

Spain 1823
Belgium 1831
Army of the Rhine (France): Spicheren, Borny, Rezonville, Noiseville, Colombey 1870.

World War I
On July 31, 1914, the regiment was assigned to the Sordet cavalry corps, brigaded with the 21st Dragoons in General Lastour's 5th Division. In August, it participated in the raid on Belgium which led to the siege of Liège, then Neufchâteau, Fleurus and Orbais, and then was back in France in Maubeuge on August 21. From August 23 to September 4, the regiment covered the retreat of the French Army after the defeat at the Battle of Charleroi. The regiment was near Versailles on September 5. In the First Battle of the Marne, from September 5 to 14, the 5th Dragoons were engaged in Betz, Nanteuil, Margny, Rosière and Senlis. Following these successes, the regiment received the honour of adding "L'Ourcq 1914" on its banner.

In the "Race to the Sea" from September 14, the 5th Dragoons crossed the Somme at Péronne, fighting in the First Battle of Arras, Picardy, in Lens on October 4, an attack by foot in Riez-Bailleul where it pushed the enemy back several kilometres. On November 11, it arrived near Ypres, where it dug in the trenches.

In February 1915, the regiment embarked for Champagne, then in March for the Vosges, where it has the honour of inscribing "Vosges 1915" on its banner. In May, the 5th Dragoon is in Amiens, in June in Artois where it goes back to serving in the trenches.

1916: The regiment still serves in the trenches, in groups of 200 men. Colonel Massiat replace Colonel Dauve at the commandment of the regiment.

1917: On March 19, the 5th Dragoon reaches Noyon, where it is employed in discovery missions in the surroundings of Chauny-Tergnier and then, by foot, goes back in the trenches in the Coucy sector. On August 15, Lieutenant-Colonel Bucant succeeds to Colonel Massiat.

1918: Until the end of May, the regiment remains inactive, stationed for rest. On March 18, a new change in the corps commandment brings Lieutement-Colonel Letexerant at the head of the 5th Dragoon.

On May 28, the regiment brings itself towards Meaux, after a long horse march. The 5th Dragoon sets foot in Mareuil and occupies Montigny. On June 2, it attacks the enemy by foot in Marizy and Passy-en-Valois. This surprise attack, without artillery preparation, stops the progression of German troops. In July, in Villesaint, the Germans, who had taken over Dermans and Château-Tierry and has crossed the Marne are driven back, after several counter-attacks, by-foot members of the 5th Dragoon. On July 17, the regiment participates in the recapture of Œuilly and to the enemy's rejection on the Marne. The Second Battle of the Marne is won and the banner now bears the name of that victory: "La Marne 1918". The Germans are retreating and the 5th Dragoon is informed of the victory a few kilometres before Nancy on November 11, 1918.

The 5th Dragoon Regiment participated in the final offensive, entering the Palatinate on December 6 and was stationed in Pirmasens from December to January 1919, then in Landau in February, then Nierstein Oppenhiem on the Rhine in July 1919. In September, the regiment settles in Worms, then Düsseldorf. It was not until 1925 that the 5th Dragoon returned to France, first in Auxonne and then in Gray, where it was disbanded on October 28, 1928.

In November 1929 the regimental banner was entrusted to the 5e Battaillon de dragons portés, a unit that had just been created, on March 9, 1929, replacing the 6e groupe de Chasseurs Cyclistes.

World War II
In 1939 the 5e bataillon de dragons portés was transformed into the "5th Dragoon Regiment". As part of the 1st Cavalry Division it embarked for Aisne on August 27. Following a reorganization in 1940 it passed in the 11th B.L.M. of the Arras General in February. On May 10, it is in Revin, crossed over the Meuse in Dinan and fought  in Belgium until May 15, where it participated in the beautiful feat of arms of Morville which allowed the banner to bear the inscription "Meuse 1940". Significantly diminished, the remaining elements pulled back and took position  from Hirson, after which they regrouped in Le Nouvion on May 16. On May 17, they settle as support in Oisy. On May 18, what remained of the regiment, 10 officers and 130 brigadiers and dragoons carrying about 5 cartridges each, withdraw in Bohain. While moving, they were intercepted by German tanks. After this last combat with no ammunition left, they remaining elements were taken prisoner. The survivors and the regimental batch withdraw in la Souterraine, where the regiment is disbanded. The banner was taken from the Germans and hidden in the castle of Meyrieu, where it remained until the Libération.
Following the model of the armistice army, the regiment was reformed in Mâcon in August 1940. On November 8, 1942, following the Anglo-American invasion of French North Africa, the regiment was sent to Toulon to participate in coastal defence, which lasted 10 days. Under Case Anton, the Germans occupied Vichy France and the regiment was disarmed at Macon on September 27.

The Resistance
Most of the demobilized dragoons fought on in clandestinity. Many of them, arrested by the Gestapo were tortured, massacred or died in deportation. Their sacrifice allows for the inscription "Résistance Bourgogne 1944" on the regimental banner. The 5th in resistance participated in the liberation of Mâcon, Chalon-sur-Saône and Autun. In September 1944, reconstituted in G.R.D., it held the sector of the Beaufortin in the Alps and fought in the Ubaye valley. On April 22 and 23, 1944, it took the La Roche-la-Croix and Saint-Ours forts and participated in the capture of the Col de Larche. On Easter Monday of 1945 in Chambéry, General de Gaulle gave the regiment its banner back. The 5th Dragoon was reformed with two squadrons of Hotchkiss tanks and two reconnaissance squadrons on Bren Carriers.

Austria
1945: Early September, the regiment leaves Chambéry for the surroundings of l'Arbois to receive complementary material. On September 8, 1945, it leaves its quarters for Austria. On November 8, it is reviewed by General Betouard in Dornbirn then moves towards West Tyrol on November 10. The squadrons settle in Lemoos, Ehrwald, Muhl, the headquarters and the EHR in Reutte.

From French North Africa to today
1955: After five years of living in Austria, the 5th Dragoons goes back to France and settles in Périgueux where it is transformed into a medium Sherman tank regiment. On February 1, the regiment is transformed into an Instruction Center for the Armored Arm and Cavalry branch for units engaged in French North Africa. It is disbanded in 1964. On September 5, 1955, an infantry-type battalion is created with officers of the 5th Dragoons. This unit, assembled at the Ruchart Camp, takes the name of "Dragoon Battalion 2/342". It lands in Casablanca on October 10 and is stationed east of Rabat.
1956: In January, the 2/342 moves to Touissit, south of Oujda to ensure the protection of the Algeria-Morocco border between Oujda and Figuig. On March 1, it becomes the 21st Dragoon Regiment.
1964–1978: On June 1, 1964, the 7th Chasseur Regiment of Africa in Friedrichshafen takes the name of 5th Dragoon Regiment. It is equipped with AMX-13 and AMX SS-11 tanks. In 1968, it is garrisoned in Tübingen until it is disbanded on August 31, 1978.
1978–2003: On September 1, 1978, the 5th Dragoon Regiment is reborn in Valdahon as an AMX-30B combat tank regiment, replacing the disbanded 30th Dragoons.
In 1991, it is part of the 7th Regional Military Division and comprises an ECS, 3 tanks squadrons with AMX 17, an instruction squadron and the lighting squadron of the armored division.
In 1992, it receives more AMX-30B and gets another tank squadron.
In July 1994, the land army reorganization put the regiment into the 27th Mountain Infantry Division. It became the armored regiment of the division with its headquarters in Grenoble.
The 5th Dragoon Regiment remains operational until the end. Its squadrons are engaged in UN peace missions in Lebanon and Bosnia as well as in missions overseas, including Guadeloupe.

Structure
Combat Squadrons
 Escadron de reconnaissance et d'intervention - Armored recon squadron
 1er Escadron blindé - 1st Armored squadron
 2e Escadron blindé - 2nd Armored squadron
 3e Escadron blindé - 3rd Armored squadron
 1ère Compagnie d'infanterie - 1st Support infantry company
 2e Compagnie d'infanterie - 2nd Support infantry company
Support Squadrons
 Escadron de commandement et de logistique - Command and logistics squadron
 Compagnie d'appui mixte (génie et artillerie) - Mixed engineer and artillery company
 Escadron d'intervention de réserve - Reserve squadron

Filiation 
Double heritage:

 1656: Foreign Dragoons of the King (Dragons étrangers du Roi)
 1668: Colonel-General Regimen (Régiment Colonel-Général), formed by the duplication of the Foreign Dragoons of the King
 1791: 5th Dragoon Regiment
 1814: Dragoon Regiment of the Dauphin (n°3)
 1815: 5th Dragoon Regiment
 1816: Dragoon Regiment of the Hérault (n°5)
 1825: 5th Dragoon Regiment
 1928: Disbanded
 1929: Recreated following the traditions of the 6thgroup of cyclist chasseurs (6e groupe de chasseurs cyclistes (6th DC) and of the 5th dragoons under the name of 5th carrier dragoons battalion
 1939: 5th Dragoon Regiment
 1942: Disbanded
 1944: 5th Dragoon Regiment
 1946: Disbanded
 1948: 5th Dragoon Regiment
 1951: Disbanded
 1953: 5th Dragoon Regiment
 1964: Disbanded and immediately recreated with elements from the 7th Chasseurs Regiment of Africa (7e Régiment de chasseurs d'Afrique (7e RCA )
2003: Disbanded on June 30, 2003.

Garrisons

1871–1873: Camp de Graves, Abbeville, Amiens
1873–1885: Saint Omer
1885–1914: Compiègne
1919–1925: Worms puis Düsseldorf
1925–1928: Auxonne puis Gray
1948–1951: Schwaz et Hall (Austria)
1953–1964: Périgueux
1964–1968: Friedrichshafen
1968–1978: Tübingen
1978–2003: Le Valdahon

Corps chiefs

Colonel Generals (from 1668)

 1668: Antoine Nompar de Caumont, Duke of Lauzun
 1669: Nicolas d'Argouges, Marquis of Rannes
 1678: Louis François, duc de Boufflers
 1692: René de Froulay de Tessé
 1703: Antoine V de Gramont, Duke of Guiche
 1704: François de Franquetot de Coigny
 1734: Jean-Antoine-François de Franquetot, Count of Coigny
 1748: François de Franquetot, Duke of Coigny (for the second time, in replacement of his brother, killed in a duel)
 1754: Marie-Charles-Louis d'Albert de Luynes, Duke of Chevreuse
 1771: François-Henri de Franquetot de Coigny, Duke of Coigny
 1783: Louis-Joseph-Charles-Amable d'Albert, Duke of Luynes

Mestres de camp, commandants and colonels

 1671: Gabriel de Cassagnet, Marquis of Tilladet
 1681: Balthazar Phelypeaux, Count of Saint Florentin
 1692: N. de Saint Mars
 1694: N. Moret de Bournonville
 1702: Charles Legendre de Berville
 1719: N. de Préval
 1727: Jean Toussaint de La Pierre, Marquis of Frémeur
 1744: Gédéon Marie Léopold, Marquis of Goyon
 1748: Charles Marie Léopold, Count of Dunois
 1758: Marie Jean Louis Riquet, Chevalier of Caraman
 1769: Louis-Joseph-Charles-Amable d'Albert, Duke of Luynes
 1771: Jean-Philippe de Franquetot, Chevalier of Coigny
 1780: Jean Jacob, Baron of Coëhorn
 1784: Antoine Louis de La Vieuville, Marquis of Wignacourt
 1786: Hugues Hyacinthe-Timoléon, Duke of Cossé
 1788: Pierre Charles, Count of Seuil
 1791: Joachim Charton
 1792: Auguste Marie Henri Picot de Dampierre
 1792: Marc Antoine de Beaumont
 1793: Pierre Joseph Le Clerc, dit Verdet
 1796: Édouard Jean Baptiste Milhaud
 1800: Louis Bonaparte
 1803: Ythier Sylvain Privé
 1804: Jacques Nicolas, Baron Lacour
 1808: Louis Ernest Joseph, Count of Sparre
 1812: Jean-Baptiste Louis Morin
 1815: Jean-Baptiste Antoine Canavas de Saint-Amand
 1815: Borie de Vintimille
 1816: de Calvières
 1818: de Hanache
 1830: de Lafitte
 1833: Koenig
 1843: de Solliers

Corps chiefs

1900: Villiers
1903: Granier de Cassagnac
1906: Gallet
1907: Boudenat
1910: de Lallemand du Marais
1914: Dauve
1916: Maissiat
1917: Bucant
1918: Letixerant
1920: Morgon
1921: Herbillon
1923: Villemont
1925: Wallace
1929: de Causans
1934: de Saint-Laumer
1938: Drand de Villers
1940: Chavannes de Dalmassy
1940: Brousset
1940: Watteau
1944: de La Ferté Senectère
1945: de Legue de Keplean
1946: de Coulanges
1948: d'Origny
1951: Dewatre
1952: Brute de Remur
1954: Jouslin de Noray
1957: Lavigne
1959: de Chasteignier
1961: Ceroni
1964: Duplay
1966: Gilliot
1968: Martin
1970: Ract-Madoux
1972: de la Follye de Joux
1974: Pichot
1975: Chaix
1977: Morin
1978: Allard
1979: Charpy
1981: Toujouse
1983: d'Hérouville
1985: Millier
1987: Ledeuil
1989: Saulais
1991: Boyer
1993: Leduc
1995: de Quatrebarbes
1997: de La Bretoigne
1999–2001: Colonel MARTIAL
2001–2003: Colonel ESPARBES

Banner 
It bears, sewed in golden letters in its layers, the following inscriptions:

 Valmy 1792
 Wattignies 1793
 Arcole 1796
 Austerlitz 1805
 Eylau 1807
 L'Ourcq 1914
 Vosges 1915 (traditions of the 6th groupe de chasseurs cyclistes)
 La Marne 1918
 La Meuse 1940
 Bourgogne Resistance 1944

Decorations

Its tie is decorated:

With the Croix de Guerre 1914–1918, with 3 palms and 2 silver stars (distinctions of the 6 chasseurs cyclistes).
 With the Croix de Guerre 1939–1945, with 1 palm.
 Fourragère, with the colours of the Croix de Guerre ribbon, 1914–1918.

Badges

Heraldry

The first badge was designed in 1929 by Captain Lemaire. It represented an "azure star kept in a giant ivory number 5- the badge being entirely enamelled and unframed".

The last badge to be used was created in 1965. It features the model helmet from 1874, with which the Dragoons went to the front in 1914. The mane was exaggeratedly widened in order to accommodate the crowned monogram of king Louis XIV, framing the number 5. The inscription on the edging reminds us that the regiment was created in 1668 to be attached to the responsibility of the Colonel General of the Dragoons created the same year for the benefit of the famous Duke of Lauzun.

References
Notes

References

Dragoon regiments of France
Military units and formations established in 1656
Military units and formations disestablished in 2003
Disbanded units and formations of France
1656 establishments in France